Morašice is a municipality and village in Chrudim District in the Pardubice Region of the Czech Republic. It has about 800 inhabitants.

Administrative parts
Villages of Holičky, Janovice, Skupice and Zbyhněvice are administrative parts of Morašice.

References

Villages in Chrudim District